Edward Harding may refer to:

 Ted Harding (1921–2004), Australian politician and rugby league footballer
 Edward John Harding (1880–1954), British civil servant and diplomat

See also
Edward Hardin (1922–2006), oil executive